James Ryan (born 12 May 1945) is a Scottish former professional footballer who played as a winger. He spent the majority of his professional career in England, starting with Manchester United before moving to Luton Town in 1970. In 1976, he moved to the United States, where he played for the Dallas Tornado in the North American Soccer League (NASL) and the Wichita Wings in the Major Indoor Soccer League (MISL).

Upon his return to England in 1984, Ryan took over as manager of Luton Town's reserve team before taking charge of the senior team from January 1990 to May 1991. In June 1991, he was appointed by Alex Ferguson as the manager of Manchester United's reserve team, a position he held for ten years. He was also the club's assistant manager for the 2001–02 season, before being made Director of Youth Football in 2002. He retired in June 2012, following 21 years on the Manchester United coaching staff. He is the father of former footballer and current manager of Manchester united U18s Neil Ryan.

Playing career
Born in Stirling, Ryan started his career with Cowie Hearts. At the age of 17, he was spotted by a scout and invited for an initial two-week trial with English club Manchester United. The trial was extended to a month and Ryan signed as an apprentice with the club on 7 December 1962. A month later, he signed his first professional contract, but it was not until May 1966 that he made his first-team debut, playing on the right wing in the final four league games of the 1965–66 season. He scored his first goal in the third of those games, the third goal in a 6–1 home win over Aston Villa.

He played for Manchester United for four more seasons and was part of the team that won the 1966–67 Football League and 1967–68 European Cup. However, being in competition for a position with George Best (among others) meant that his appearances were limited and he left the club for Luton Town in 1970, along with Don Givens. In five seasons with Manchester United, he played 27 times and scored four goals. He played for Luton Town until 1976, when he left to play four seasons in the North American Soccer League with the Dallas Tornado. In 1979, the NASL players decided to strike for better pay, but Ryan was the only Tornado player to honour the strike. At the end of the 1979 season, Ryan moved to the Wichita Wings of the Major Indoor Soccer League where he finished his career with three indoor seasons.

Managerial career
After living in the United States for eight years, Ryan returned to England to take over as manager of the Luton Town reserve team. Following Luton's dismissal of Ray Harford in 1990, Ryan was promoted for an 18-month spell as manager, saving the club from relegation on the last day of two successive seasons. However, he was sacked at the end of the 1990–91 season and replaced by David Pleat. About a month later, Manchester United manager Alex Ferguson invited Ryan to return to the club as reserve team manager. He held the position until 2000, when he was promoted to coach the first-team. After assistant manager Brian Kidd left to manage Blackburn Rovers in December 1998, Ryan stood in as Ferguson's assistant until Steve McClaren's appointment in February 1999, taking full charge of the side for their 3–2 defeat at home to Middlesbrough on 19 December 1998, which Ferguson missed in order to attend a funeral. Ryan was named as assistant manager again after McClaren left to manage Middlesbrough in 2001, but remained in the post for just one season until Carlos Queiroz took over. From 2002, he was named as the club's Director of Youth Football, a position he held until his retirement in June 2012.

Career statistics

References

External links

Profile at StretfordEnd.co.uk
Profile at MUFCinfo.com
Profile at NASLJerseys.com

1945 births
Living people
Dallas Tornado players
Luton Town F.C. players
Luton Town F.C. managers
Major Indoor Soccer League (1978–1992) players
Manchester United F.C. non-playing staff
Manchester United F.C. players
North American Soccer League (1968–1984) indoor players
North American Soccer League (1968–1984) players
Footballers from Stirling
Scottish footballers
Scottish expatriate footballers
Scottish football managers
English Football League players
Wichita Wings (MISL) players
Expatriate soccer players in the United States
Association football forwards
Scottish expatriate sportspeople in the United States